Hellabuster is the second studio album by the band Box Codax, released in the United Kingdom on 10 May 2011. In the first full-length release since their album Only An Orchard Away in 2006, Box Codax tell the peculiar and young life of Hellabuster in 13 episodes, with each song being accompanied by its own video.

Critical reception

The NME awarded the album for its disco-prog eccentricity 7/10, with Emily Mackay of NME writing about the album: "the whole is an eccentric gem that pulls you back again and again."
The songs, which move between skewed disco, post punk and glammier studio prog were accentuated by 13 videos, proving their artistic approach to music and the originality of the band. The video for the stripped-down acoustic song "Dawning", directed by Turner Prize winning artist Martin Creed, received much critical acclaim.

Singles
 "Hellabuster / Choco Pudding" was released as the lead single from the album in March 2011.
 "Seven Silver Remixes" was released as the second single / EP in June 2011.
 "Where You Go / Dawning" was released in October 2011 as a split-single together with artist Martin Creed. The limited vinyl single is featuring hand painted artwork by Martin Creed.

Track listing

Personnel
Band
 Manuela Gernedel
 Alexander Ragnew
 Nick McCarthy

References

External links
Box Codax's official band website
Hellabuster's official video album website

2011 albums